Elypse is the third studio album released by Camila on June 3, 2014. The album was the first released by the band as a duo, after the departure of singer Samo. The song "Perdón" was featured in the novela La Malquerida starring Victoria Ruffo, Christian Meier, and Ariadne Díaz. The album was nominated for Album of the Year and won for Best Contemporary Pop Vocal Album at the 2014 Latin Grammy Awards. At the Grammy Awards of 2015 it was nominated for Best Latin Pop Album.

Track listing

Charts

Weekly charts

Year-end charts

Certifications

References

2014 albums
Camila (band) albums
Spanish-language albums
Latin Grammy Award for Best Contemporary Pop Vocal Album